Moto Roader (spelled Motoroader in Europe) is a futuristic racing game developed by NCS for the PC-Engine/TurboGrafx-16. The game is the first in a series which includes Moto Roader 2 and Moto Roader MC. It is notable for having a possible five players race simultaneously, one more player than most games' maximum number.

It was released on the Wii's Virtual Console in Europe on January 5, 2007, in North America on January 15, 2007, and in Japan on January 16, 2007. It was released on the Wii U's Virtual Console in Japan on December 17, 2014, in North America and Europe on October 12, 2017, and in Australia on October 13, 2017.

Reception
Computer and Video Games rated the PC Engine version 85% in 1989.

Notes

References 

1989 video games
Hudson Soft games
PlayStation Network games
Science fiction racing games
TurboGrafx-16 games
Video games developed in Japan
Virtual Console games
Virtual Console games for Wii U
Masaya Games games